Adil Mezgour (born 11 March 1983) is a Moroccan footballer who plays for S.C. Faetano. He spent entire professional career in Italy.

Biography

Early career
Born in Casablanca, Morocco Mezgour started his career with an amateur team in Sala Bolognese, Emilia–Romagna in 1999. He then left for a team in Anzola dell'Emilia. Since 2002 he played for Virtus Castelfranco at Eccellenza Emilia–Romagna and won promotion to Serie D in 2004.

Lega Pro
In 2008, he left Castelfranco Emilia and signed by another Emilia–Romagna team Bellaria – Igea Marina on free transfer. He played 17 Seconda Divisione matches before left for Cassino, of Group C of Seconda Divisione. He played 45 league matches for the Lazio team until the club was expelled from the professional league due to its financial difficulties.

In July 2010, he was signed by Savona and a year later joined to U.S.D. Sestri Levante 1919.

Honours
Eccellenza Emilia–Romagna: 2004

References

External links
 
 Football.it Profile 

1983 births
Living people
Moroccan footballers
Footballers from Casablanca
Moroccan expatriate footballers
A.C. Bellaria Igea Marina players
A.S.D. Cassino Calcio 1924 players
Savona F.B.C. players
Association football forwards
Expatriate footballers in Italy
Moroccan expatriate sportspeople in Italy